The Building Societies Association (BSA) was originally established in 1869. It is the voice for all 43 UK building societies as well as six large credit unions.  Together these organisations serve around 25 million customers up and down the length of the UK.

The BSA's objective is to push for the best outcomes for building societies and other members from the plethora of new and changing regulation and legislation in the UK and Europe.

Key sector statistics 
Building societies have total assets of £415 billion and, together with their subsidiaries, hold residential mortgages of almost £330 billion, 23% of the total outstanding in the UK.

They hold over £280 billion of retail deposits, accounting for 19% of all such deposits in the UK and account for 37% of all cash ISA balances.

Building societies employ approximately 42,500 full and part-time staff and operate through approximately 1,470 branches.

For people, not shareholders 
Building societies are owned by their members. Borrowers and savers automatically become a member of their society when they take out a mortgage or open a savings account.

While their businesses must be run as rigorously as any bank on the High Street – societies operate in the same regulatory environment – their purpose is different.  A company must operate to the benefit of its shareholders, a mutual operates to the benefit of its members and takes business decisions in a different way because of this.

For a brief overview of the sector, see the For People, Not Shareholders leaflet.

References

External links 

 

Building societies of the United Kingdom
Banks established in 1869
Mortgage industry associations
Trade associations based in the United Kingdom
Organisations based in the City of Westminster